The following is a list of the CHUM Chart number-one singles of 1960.

See also
1960 in music

References

1960
Canada Chum
1960 in Canadian music